Alan Crofoot (June 2, 1929 – March 5, 1979) was a Canadian operatic Heldentenor, character tenor specialist, and actor. He was also the host of Mr. Piper, a 1960s children's television series that aired on the CBC in Canada.

Career
Crofoot was born in Toronto, Ontario, Canada. He attended the University of Toronto where he earned a Master's degree in psychology. His operatic career began at the Canadian Opera, as Spoletta in Tosca, in 1956. Crofoot also appeared in stage productions of musicals such as Man of La Mancha, in London's West End, and Oliver! on Broadway and Winnipeg's Rainbow Stage.

From 1963 to 1964, Crofoot hosted the CBC children's program Mr. Piper, which also became well known in the United Kingdom.  Crofoot hosted the show dressed as a Pied Piper, with a flower in his hat. He is the off-screen narrator with non-CG animation through the window.

He created the role of Josiah Creach in the world premiere of Carlisle Floyd's Markheim, with Norman Treigle and Audrey Schuh, in New Orleans (1966), as well as appearances at the New York City Opera (Herod in Salome, opposite Maralin Niska, in 1975) and the Metropolitan Opera (The Bartered Bride, directed by John Dexter, in 1978).  Also in his repertoire was the Jailer/Inquisitor in Il prigioniero.

In 1970, Mr. Crofoot appeared in the world premiere of My Heart’s in the Highlands, a chamber opera in two acts by the American composer Jack Beeson. The opera was first broadcast on National Educational Television, predecessor of today’s Public Broadcasting Service, on March 17, 1970. The production was recorded at Boston’s WGBH-TV in November 1969. It was directed by the Emmy Award-winning TV director Kirk Browning. The opera’s chamber orchestra was conducted by Peter Herman Adler. Among the other cast members were bass-baritone Spiro Malas and contralto Lili Chookasian.

In 1974, Mr. Crofoot appeared in the world premiere of Hans Werner Henze's Rachel, la cubana, also for NET Opera Theater, opposite Lee Venora, Susanne Marsee and Alan Titus, conducted by the composer.  In 1976, he was in the American premiere of Sessions' Montezuma, as Jeronimo Aguilar, conducted by Sarah Caldwell, in Boston.

Personal life
Crofoot was previously married to fellow opera singer Dodi Protero. They divorced around 1972. At the time of his death, Crofoot was engaged to Jean Godden.

Death
In the early morning hours of March 5, 1979, Crofoot jumped from his fifth floor hotel room window in Dayton, Ohio. He died of his injuries at Miami Valley Hospital shortly thereafter. At the time of his death, Crofoot was set to direct the production of Salome by the Dayton Opera Company.

Crofoot's manager, James Sardos, later said that Crofoot was generally happy but had been experiencing "fits of depression" caused by blood pressure medication he had been taking. On the night before his death, Crofoot had been drinking beer which Sardos believed reacted adversely with medication leading to Crofoot's death.

Discography 
 Offenbach:  Orphée aux enfers (Faris, 1960) EMI
 Floyd: Markheim (Schuh, Treigle; Andersson, 1966) VAI [live]
 Strauss: Elektra (Borkh, Schuh, Resnik, Rayson; Andersson, 1966) VAI [live]

Videography 
 Smetana: The Bartered Bride (Stratas, Gedda, Vickers, Talvela; Levine, Dexter, 1978) [live]

Footnotes

References 
  Who's Who in Opera, edited by Maria F. Rich, Arno Press, 1976.

External links

 
 
 
Alan Crofoot on Canadian Encyclopedia

1929 births
20th-century Canadian male actors
Canadian male film actors
Canadian male musical theatre actors
Canadian operatic tenors
Canadian male stage actors
Canadian television personalities
Canadian male television actors
Heldentenors
Male actors from Toronto
Musicians from Toronto

Suicides by jumping in the United States
Suicides in Ohio
20th-century Canadian male opera singers
1979 suicides